Klassics with a "K", was the only full-length album by Kostars, a side project of Luscious Jackson members Vivian Trimble and Jill Cunniff, released in 1996 on Grand Royal. 

Fellow Luscious Jackson members Kate Schellenbach and Gabby Glaser contributed drums and lead guitar, respectively, to the album. Both Dean and Gene Ween of Ween contributed as well. The album was engineered by Josephine Wiggs, bass player of the Breeders, marking her first full-length engineering project. It was recorded and mixed in 25 days at Meat and Potatoes Studio, a 16-track home studio put together in the Luscious Jackson rehearsal room.

The duo's only other release was a 7-inch single of the track "Hey Cowboy".

Track listing
"Never So Lonely" (Jill Cunniff, Vivian Trimble) – 3:30
"Jacqueline" (Cunniff, Trimble) – 3:33
"Red Umbrella" (Cunniff, Trimble) – 3:58
"Jolene on the Freeway" (Cunniff) – 3:23
"One Sunny Day" (Trimble) – 4:07
"Hey Cowboy" (Trimble) – 4:49
"Reverend" (Cunniff, Trimble) – 2:59
"Mama Never Said" (Cunniff) – 3:54
"Don't Know Why" (Trimble) – 3:47 
"French Kiss" (Cunniff) – 2:47

Personnel

Kostars
Jill Cunniff – accordion, bass guitar, acoustic guitar, electric guitar, vocals, wah wah guitar
Vivian Trimble – ARP synthesizer, Casio, acoustic guitar, Moog synthesizer, Multivox, piano, vocals

Additional musicians
Gabrielle Glaser – electric guitar
Kate Schellenbach – drum machine, drums, percussion
Niko Tavernise – trumpet, vocals
Dean Ween – electric guitar, vocals
Gene Ween – electric guitar, vocals
Tuta Aquino – sequencing

Technical
Kostars – co-producers
Josephine Wiggs – engineer, mixing, co-producer 
Kate Schellenbach – assistant engineer, mixing assistant
Wally Traugott – mastering
Danny Clinch – photography
Robert Schroeder – design
Jack Torso – liner notes

"Hey Cowboy" 7-inch
Side one
"Hey Cowboy"

Side two
"French Kiss"
"Don't Know Why (You Went Away)" (Special 7-inch Mix)

[  AMG Track listing info]

References 

1996 albums
Kostars albums
Grand Royal albums